The 1930 Saint Mary's Gaels football team was an American football team that represented Saint Mary's College of California during the 1930 college football season.  In their tenth season under head coach Slip Madigan, the Gaels compiled an 8–1 record, shut out five of nine opponents, and outscored all opponents by a combined total of 168 to 31.  The Gaels' victories included a 21–6 besting of UCLA, a 20–12 besting of Fordham, and a 7–6 victory over Oregon. The lone setback was a 7–6 loss to California.

End Harry Ebding was selected by both the Associated Press and the United Press as first-team player on the 1930 All-Pacific Coast football team.

Schedule

References

Saint Mary's
Saint Mary's Gaels football seasons
Saint Mary's Gaels football